Stein is a mountain in Bavaria, Germany, located south-east of Kochel am See over Lake Kochel. 

Mountains of Bavaria
Mountains of the Alps